Krishna Bhakta Pokhrel (born 4 July 1967) is a Nepali communist politician and was a member of the House of Representatives of the federal parliament of Nepal. He was elected to the House of Representatives in 2018 as a part of his second term having previously been elected to the second constituent assembly in 2013.

He is a lawyer by profession and had been practising law at Chitwan District Court for more than 20 years, as of 2013.

Personal life 
He was born on 4 July 1967 in Parbatipur-4, Chitwan. He has three daughters.

Political Career
He joined politics as a student and served as secretary of ANNFSU, the student wing of CPN UML in 1992. He also became the vice-chairman of Chitwan district working committee for the party. As of 2013, had been a CPN UML Chitwan district committee member for 20 years.

In the second constituent assembly election held in 2013, he was the candidate for CPN UML in Chitwan-3 constituency and defeated Narayan Dahal of CPN (Maoist Centre).

For his current term, he was elected under the first-past-the-post system from Chitwan-2 constituency as a candidate from CPN UML of the left alliance. Following his election to parliament, he was appointed chair of the rule-drafting committee of the House. He is also the Chairperson of the Law, Justice and Human Rights Committee of the House.

References

Living people
Communist Party of Nepal (Unified Marxist–Leninist) politicians
Nepal Communist Party (NCP) politicians
1967 births
People from Chitwan District
20th-century Nepalese lawyers
Nepal MPs 2017–2022
Members of the 2nd Nepalese Constituent Assembly
21st-century Nepalese lawyers